Yapraklı can refer to:

 Yapraklı
 Yapraklı Dam
 Yapraklı, Elmalı
 Yapraklı, Ergani
 Yapraklı, Fatsa
 Yapraklı, Kahta